Diamir or Diamer may refer to:

Diamir, the west face of Nanga Parbat
Diamer District, in Gilgit–Baltistan, Pakistan